Org 6582 
HCl: [59905-71-4]

is an SSRI research chemical. It is potent and long-lasting at inhibiting 5HT re-uptake.

See also
 Experimental drug
 Investigational New Drug
 Metazocine structural analog that is a functional opioid instead of MAT inhibitor

References

Antidepressants
Serotonin reuptake inhibitors
Chloroarenes
Heterocyclic compounds with 3 rings
Nitrogen heterocycles